Mi esqueleto is a 1959 Argentine comedy film directed by Lucas Demare. It stars Luis Sandrini, Julia Sandoval, Franca Boni and Mario Pocoví. César Maranghello called the film a "fiasco".

Cast
  Luis Sandrini
  Julia Sandoval
  Franca Boni
  Mario Pocoví
  Mariano Bauzá
  Carlos Enríquez
  Lalo Malcolm
  Max Citelli
  José María Fra
  Ignacio Finder
  Adolfo Linvel
  Norma Nort
  Orestes Soriani
  Enrique Kossi
  Rafael Diserio
  Antonio Scelfo
  José Guisone
  Juan Alighieri
  Warly Ceriani
  Rogelio Romano

References

External links
 

1959 films
Argentine comedy films
1950s Spanish-language films
Argentine black-and-white films
Films directed by Lucas Demare
1959 comedy films
1950s Argentine films